Matías Ríos (February 21, 1895 – July, 1924) was a Cuban infielder in the Negro leagues and Cuban League during the 1910s and 1920s.

A native of Sagua la Grande, Cuba, Ríos made his Negro leagues debut in 1915 with the Cuban Stars (West). With the exception of the 1918 season, he played for the Stars through 1924. Ríos also played in the Cuban League for the Leopardos de Santa Clara in 1923 and 1924. He died in 1924 at age 29.

References

External links
 and Baseball-Reference Black Baseball stats and Seamheads

1895 births
1924 deaths
Place of death missing
Date of death missing
Cuban Stars (West) players
Leopardos de Santa Clara players
20th-century African-American sportspeople
Baseball infielders